Magnolia Matewan High School was a public high school located in Matewan, West Virginia. The school has been in a succession of four different buildings since 1914. It was formerly known as Magnolia District High School. The mascot is the tiger (Matewan Tigers). The colors seem to be debated occasionally, but usually consist of green and gold (the different shades of green, as well as white as opposed to gold are the subjects of the debates).

The school was located beside the middle school, and the two share the same cafeteria and parking lot.

Declining enrollment led to the consolidation of MHS with three of the other four county high schools to form Mingo Central High School in 2011.

Notable alumni
 Don Blankenship, CEO of Massey Energy Co.

References

External links
 Matewan.com

Public high schools in West Virginia
Educational institutions established in 1914
Schools in Mingo County, West Virginia
Educational institutions disestablished in 2011
2011 disestablishments in West Virginia
Defunct public high schools in the United States
1914 establishments in West Virginia